The Barmat scandal was a political scandal in 1924 and 1925 in the Weimar Republic which implicated the Social Democratic Party of Germany in corruption, war profiteering, fraud, bribery, and other financial misdeeds. The scandal provided right-wing political forces within Germany with a basis for attacking the Social Democrats and the republic itself. Antisemitism in connection with the scandal also featured prominently in Nazi propaganda, since the Barmat brothers were Jewish.

The scandal was used by the German far-right to foment the belief that wealthy Jewish families in quasi-criminal operations found fertile ground in the Republic and easily exploited the Social Democrats to do their bidding. The right-wing press was eager to use the scandal as a vehicle for antisemitism.

Background
The Weimar government was headed by Gustav Bauer, a Social Democrat, as Chancellor from June 1919 through March 1920. Friedrich Ebert was the Republic's initial President, from the end of World War I until his death in February 1925.

Julius Barmat was a Russian Jew who became a wholesale merchant with "less than perfect character." After World War I, he moved to the Netherlands where he bought foodstuffs in the Netherlands to export into Germany (which had suffered badly during and after the war from lack of food) after the end of the war. He made a large amount of money in this endeavor and was—at least from the view of the nationalists—engaged in war profiteering.

Barmat had profited from political patronage. He had joined the Dutch Social Democrats in 1908 and after the war had given the Social Democrats Second International free office space in his Amsterdam home. He consequently met German Social Democrats and developed connections that were helpful in transactions in foodstuffs for Germany.

Barmat also had connections with Ernst Heilman (the SPD leader in the Prussian Landtag) and Gustav Bauer (former Reich Chancellor). Heilmann became close friends with Julius and wrote letters of recommendation and served on the boards of six Barmat companies, but did not accept financial rewards. However, Wilhelm Richter, President of the Berlin Police, did receive gifts from Barmat.

Barmat also met Ebert as well as Otto Wels (Chairman of the SPD) and (indiscreetly, it appears in retrospect) bragged about his political connections.

The Misdeeds
The Barmats received German visas and established business relations with various state offices, including the Prussian State Bank and the Preußische Seehandlung. In return they donated around 20,000 Reichsmarks to Social Democratic newspapers, founded a children's home in Pirna, and paid commissions to Bauer.

The national government's postal department generated considerable cash as a result of the mail and it invested idle funds with Barmat's investment company. The Prussian State Bank also loaned a considerable sum of money to Barmat.

Barmat, however, engaged in currency speculation with the funds, and the Barmat investment company collapsed in late 1924. Both the national Weimar government and the Prussian State Bank lost several million dollars as a result of the Barmat firm's collapse, and a Reichstag commission was formed to investigate the matter. In addition, a commission of the Prussian Landtag was also formed to investigate. Most of the investigative work (and almost all of the publicity) came from this Landtag committee, or as a result of its work, rather than from the national committee of the central parliament.

Arrests and Revelations
Various Prussian State Bank officials were arrested on 30 December 1924. The Barmat brothers were arrested early in the morning of the next day, New Year's Eve 1924.

Preliminary investigation suggested that several prominent Social Democrats had received bribes, kickbacks or other financial favors in exchange for their support of Government contracts with the Barmats. The evidence showed as follows for the leading protagonists:

Bauer
Bauer did not handle the press accusations well, keeping silent when the press exposed his membership on the board of a Barmat company, and issuing a denial of any involvement in the affair in January 1925, after the arrest of the Barmat brothers. In particular, he denied any benefit by way of financial remuneration. This was a most unfortunate public statement for Bauer, because his opponents had specific documentary evidence that it was a lie.

The first climax of the Prussian investigating commission took place in late January 1925, with Bauer, a prominent Social Democrat, giving evidence.

During his period of government service, he had helped Barmat win food supply contracts with various Reich departments. After leaving office he helped Barmat one time with a Government scrap-metal deal; Bauer was to receive a commission from Barmat for this help. In late 1923 their relationship ended over a dispute as to the amount of "commission" that Bauer would receive for this deal.

Bauer had publicly denied that he served on any Barmat supervisory board; but this was a lie, and he was forced to admit as much under the cross-examination by the Commission. He was also forced to admit that his actions in helping Barmat win government contracts were considerably more frequent and more involved that his previous statements to the press had indicated.

Despite these reversals of his prior statements, he steadfastly and repeatedly continued to deny to the Commission that he had received any financial compensation from Barmat. However, in early February, only a few days after the testimony, the Lokal-Anzeiger reprinted a letter from Barmat to Bauer as a part of an article on the scandal. This letter was written during the period of their 1923 commission dispute over the scrap-metal deal, and identified the occasions on which Bauer had received money from Barmat.

Bauer was caught in a bald-faced lie and, it would appear, had committed perjury in denying any receipt of compensation. The SPD promptly asked Bauer to resign from the party and the Reichstag, and he did so on 6 February 1925.

The final report (October 1925) of Prussian Commission affirmed that Ebert had committed no improprieties in the affair and that his reputation was without strain relative to the scandal. While Bauer and Richter were reprimanded for careless and incautious conflict of interest, they had not profited directly or indirectly from the loans made to Barmat by the Prussian State Bank.

Ebert
The Reich Presidency election would take place in spring of 1925. The right-wing would not forfeit a chance to discredit him by association with scandal.

A motion was made in the Landtag commission in early February to investigate Ebert's knowledge of the Barmat scandal, particularly any involvement by the office of the President with the Barmats. The testimony of 23 February 1925 before the Commission established that Barmat had received letters of recommendation bearing the Presidential seal. The right-wing press made much of the testimony. It turned out that an office employee had indeed dispatched several letters of recommendation to Barmat, bearing the Presidential Seal.

Ebert had unfortunately recommended in 1919 that Barmat be given a permanent visa for his many business trips to and from Germany.

Ebert was diagnosed with appendicitis and peritonitis on 26 February. He died two days later. He was ultimately cleared of any wrongdoing by the Prussian investigating committee in the fall of 1925. Mommsen claims that Ebert's death (28 February 1925) was caused in part by the strain brought on by the Barmat scandal (particularly a result of the right-wing vilification against the Prussian government).

Höfle
Julius and Henry Barmat met with Dr. Anton Höfle, the Minister of Posts, in June 1924 and paid him bribes of some 120,000 Reichsmark over several months (In January 1924 hyperinflation had begun to be tackled with the “Rentenmark” so that by June 1924 120,000 Marks was worth something). They then borrowed 14.5 million Marks from the national Postal Department in September 1924. The loan was not secured and the Republic's money was lost when Barmat's investment speculations turned sour.

Höfle resigned his Reichstag seat on 9 February 1925 and was arrested on 10 February 1925.

Höfle died, in custody and from a drug overdose, some six days before the second round of the Presidential election. The Catholic Center press accused the prosecutors of pumping Höfle full of narcotics so that he would be available for questioning and implied that this amounted to a form of homicide. The right-wing of course claimed that Höfle's death was a suicide that amounted to his confession of guilt in the Barmat affair.

Richter
Three days after Hofle's arrest, Richter, the Police President of Prussia, was placed on an involuntary "leave" and a week later was dispatched into "interim retirement."

Heilmann
Ernst Heilmann, the SPD leader in the Prussian Landtag, revealed no compromising information, other than that he had supported Barmat's request for additional funds in early December 1924, in discussions with the Prussian Finance Minister. He was never charged or sanctioned, although some commentators did consider his intervention with the Ministry of Finance to be improper.

Elections
The right-wing press, and the Nazi Party in particular, used the Barmat scandal as a vehicle to express its underlying anti-Semitic, anti-socialist and anti-democratic sentiments. An Austrian commentator perceptively noted that the right-wing press and propaganda campaign, using the Barmat scandal as the excuse and opportunity for expressing its sentiments, was more dangerous than the military coups to which the Republic had been subjected. The press campaign appealed to the hearts and minds of those who sought an excuse and a reason for the hardships and perceived injustices that Germany continued to suffer.

The right-wing successfully propagandized that corruption was an inherent characteristic of democracy and that the only solution was the abandonment of democracy and a return to the ways of the autocratic past. They referred to the "corruption economy" which was a result of the SPD leadership in post-war Germany. The scandal provided grist for the mill of right-wing propagandists, who could fulminate against Jewish speculators and profiteers as well as against all manner of Socialist politicians and others who supported the republic. Frustrated voters had an opportunity to channel their resentment against inflation and war profiteers against specific targets, and to transfer the responsibility for those ills to the Social Democrats.

Parliamentary Election of December 1924

The Presidential Election of 1925
Reichstag elections were held 7 December 1924.  Cabinet formation was complex, taking until 15 January. The result was a bourgeois coalition of rightist and center parties in the Rechtsblock under Hans Luther as Chancellor. The SDP went into opposition against the coalition of the Center, DVP and DNVP, and it promised the Luther government a "ruthless fight."

Barmat was one of Weimar's biggest media scandals, due principally to the upcoming election for President in April 1925. Ebert was a formidable contender for re-election and the right-wing press saw an opportunity in Barmat to score political points. Ebert had died and Braun was the SPD candidate.

The Barmat Scandal was bandied about in the press in preparation for the Presidential election and it also appeared as a topic at right-wing political rallies. The right-wing Nationalpost stated the theme: The Barmat scandal was not just a tale of corruption within the Prussian State Bank or the Postal Ministry. It was rather a scandal of Social Democracy itself. Leading Social Democrats, it contended, had improperly used political influence to secure favorable treatment (such as loans and contracts) for the Barmats, in exchange for payments and other financial benefits that flowed both to themselves individually as well as to the party.

Political leaflets were distributed throughout the countryside based on the history of the scandal.

No candidate secured a majority in the first round of elections, so under the Weimar Constitution a second round of elections had to be conducted. In this round, the SPD aligned with the Center through a political deal: the SPD candidate Braun withdrew from the Presidential race and was elected president of Prussia on 3 April 1925 with the Center's support; and in return the SPD supported Marx (the Center party candidate) for Reich President.

At this point the right-wing abandoned its first-round candidate Jarres and instead offered up General Paul von Hindenburg as its candidate. The right-wing Reichsblock called the Center-SPD coalition the Barmatblock, and leaflets and pamphlets that painted the center-leftist coalition with the Barmat scandal were distributed widely throughout Germany.

Hindenburg won on April 26 by a margin of 900,000 votes, largely as a result of his appeal to new voters who had stayed home in the first round. He had campaigned on the basis of restoring non-partisanship to the Presidential office and of a general restoration of social harmony. The press campaign was a key in this close election, as Fulda observed (p. 104): The key to [Hindenburg's] success lay in the mobilization of former non-voters, and their dissatisfaction with the present system.... Hindenburg [might not have] scraped into office without four months of media barrage aimed at discrediting the Republic.

Sentencing

In early 1928 Julius and Henri Barmat were sentenced to 11 months and 6 months imprisonment for bribery, respectively.  After serving his sentence, Julius Barmat left Germany for the Low Countries. He was caught once again in another corruption scandal in which he was accused of bribery in order to obtain loans which ended up defrauding the Belgian National Bank of 34 million gold francs. He died in the St. Gillis prison in Forest (near Brussels) on 6 January 1938.

See also
 Sklarek scandal
 Glossary of the Weimar Republic

Notes

Reference works

Geyer, Martin H. (2018). Kapitalismus und politische Moral in der Zwischenkriegszeit oder: Wer war Julius Barmat? Hamburger Edition. ISBN 978-3-86854-319-3.

External links
 Poster (Nazi poster from elections of September 1930 showing a Nazi dagger killing a snake that exudes "Barmat" along with the other enemies of the NSDAP)
Teaching Guide(Nazi guide to teaching 4th to 8th grade, stating in part that "[t]he Jews Katz, Kutisker, Barmat, Sklarek, and Rotter cheated the German people of many, many millions in economic life. Despite their guilt, they managed to avoid long prison sentences.")
 

Scandals in Germany
Political scandals in Germany
Politics of the Weimar Republic
Economy of the Weimar Republic